The 2017–18 Czech First League, known as the HET liga for sponsorship reasons, was the 25th season of the Czech Republic's top-tier football league. The defending champions were Slavia Prague, who won their fourth Czech title the previous season. The season began on 28 July 2017 and ended on 26 May 2018.

Viktoria Plzeň made a league record by winning their first 14 league games of the season.

Teams

Team changes

Stadiums and locations

Personnel and kits

League table

Results
Each team plays home-and-away against every other team in the league, for a total of 30 matches played each.

Top scorers

Attendances

Number of teams by region

See also
 2017–18 Czech Cup
 2017–18 Czech National Football League

References

External links
  

2017–18 in European association football leagues
1
2017-18